Lake Artemesia is a man-made lake in Prince George's County, Maryland, located within the Lake Artemesia Natural Area in College Park and Berwyn Heights.

The lake, located between Indian Creek and Paint Branch, was constructed during the late-1980s completion of the Washington Metro's Green Line, which runs alongside the lake. Metro saved $10 million by sourcing the material locally and in return spent $8 million constructing the lake and natural area to repair the excavation damage. During the construction phase, signs identified the site as "Lake Metro."

The park is named for Artemesia N. Drefs, who donated ten lots to the county for preservation as open space in 1972. The smaller lake that existed on the site, which was created in the mid-1800s when stone was quarried from the area for use on the B&O Railroad's Washington Branch line, was already named Lake Artemesia after Artemesia's mother and grandmother, who shared the same name. Drefs's father, Arthur, surveyed the land for his Lakeland development in the 1890s; according to Drefs, the pre-existing lake was originally used to raise goldfish, but was later stocked with bass.

The 1.35 mile hiker-biker trail around the lake is part of the Anacostia Tributary Trail System and East Coast Greenway.

The site of Lake Artemesia Park was once home to about one third of the Lakeland community, an African-American community which became part of College Park, Maryland in 1945.

References

External links
 Artemesia webpage - Prince George's County Department of Parks and Recreation

Chesapeake Bay watershed
Reservoirs in Maryland
Potomac River watershed
Parks in Prince George's County, Maryland
Bodies of water of Prince George's County, Maryland